The 1999 Canadian Open was a WTA tennis tournament, played on outdoor hard courts.

Players

Seeds

  Lilia Osterloh /  Barbara Schwartz (qualifying competition)
  Cristina Torrens Valero /  Marlene Weingärtner (first round)

Qualifiers

  Gala León García /  María Sánchez Lorenzo
  Magdalena Grzybowska /  Marie-Ève Pelletier

Draw

First qualifier

Second qualifier

References
 1999 du Maurier Open Women's Doubles Qualifying Draw

Doubles Qualifying
1999 du Maurier Open
Qualification for tennis tournaments